Dendrelaphis oliveri, commonly known as Oliver's bronzeback, is a species of nonvenomous arboreal snake in the family Colubridae. The species is endemic to Sri Lanka. It is considered to be the rarest of the Sri Lankan Dendrelaphis species on account of there being only a single recorded specimen.

Etymology
Both the specific name, oliveri, and the common name, Oliver's bronzeback, are in honor of American herpetologist James A. Oliver.

Description 
Similar to other bronzebacks, D. oliveri has enlarged dorsal scales, large eyes relative to its head size, a clearly differentiated head from body, a long slender body with a long tail.

It can be identified from its Sri Lankan cogeners by the combination of a lack of a loreal scale, the prefrontals contacting the 2nd, 3rd and 4th supralabials and the 4th, 5th and 6th supralabials contacting the eye. Furthermore, it has an eye stripe that begins post-nasal and continues past the eye through to the base of the tail. Below this black ventrolateral line is a white ventrolateral line beginning at the posterior supralabials and continuing to the tail. This white ventrolateral is bordered below by another black ventrolateral that begins at the neck and continues to the tail.

The lack of a loreal scale is a character D. oliveri shares with D. effrenis in Sri Lanka. However, D. oliveri can be further identified from D. effrenis by its colour patterns and the following characters: prefrontals contacting the 2nd, 3rd and 4th supralabials (vs only 2nd and 3rd), the presence of a ventrolateral stripe (vs absent) and 2 postoculars (vs 3).

The lack of a loreal scale is a character that is occasionally seen within the Dendrelaphis genus as an anomaly, but in the case of D. oliveri, this in combination with the presence of a black-white-black ventrolateral is unique to it, and with D. effrenis, all recorded specimens showed a lack of a loreal scale. These observations show, that the lack of a loreal scale is a key identifier of these two species.

Distribution 
Only one single specimen of D. oliveri has ever been recorded, and that is E. H. Taylor's original specimen from 1950. The specimen currently resides at the Chicago Field Museum of Natural History.

The type-locality for D. oliveri is stated as north of Trincomalee based on Taylor's original catalog notes. However, this cannot be verified as no other specimen has been ever found since in the area. Therefore, it is possible that D. oliveri is not from this area and for that matter not from even Sri Lanka.

Behavior
D. oliveri is arboreal and diurnal.

Reproduction
D. oliveri is oviparous.

References

Further reading
Das I (1996). Biogeography of the Reptiles of South Asia. Malabar, Florida: Krieger Publishing Company. 87 pp. . (Dendrelaphis oliveri, new combination, p. 55).
Taylor EH (1950). "The Snakes of Ceylon". University of Kansas Science Bulletin 33 (14): 519–603. (Ahaetulla oliveri, new species, pp. 555–557, Plate XVIII, figure 1).

oliveri
Snakes of Asia
Reptiles of Sri Lanka
Endemic fauna of Sri Lanka
Reptiles described in 1950
Taxa named by Edward Harrison Taylor